New Zealand-Australian singer Stan Walker has released seven studio albums, two compilation albums, two extended plays, forty-four singles—including six as a featured artist—and twenty-one music videos. In 2009, Walker won the seventh season of Australian Idol, and signed a recording contract with Sony Music Australia. Walker's debut studio album Introducing Stan Walker, which contained selected songs he performed on Australian Idol, was released on 11 December 2009. The album debuted at number three on the Australian ARIA Albums Chart, and number two on the New Zealand Albums Chart. It was certified platinum by the Australian Recording Industry Association, and triple platinum by the Recorded Music NZ. The album's lead single "Black Box" peaked at number two on the ARIA Singles Chart, and number one on the New Zealand Singles Chart, eventually being certified double platinum in both countries.

Walker's second studio album From the Inside Out, was released on 20 August 2010. The album debuted at number two on the ARIA Albums Chart, and number one on the New Zealand Albums Chart, eventually being certified platinum by the RMNZ. The album's lead single "Unbroken" peaked at number 23 on the ARIA Singles Chart, and number nine on the New Zealand Singles Chart, eventually being certified gold in both countries. "Choose You" and "Homesick" were released as the album's second and third singles, respectively, and each attained moderate chart success. Walker's third studio album Let the Music Play was released on 18 November 2011. Three singles were released from the album: "Loud", "Light It Up" and "Music Won't Break Your Heart". "Take It Easy" was released as a single from the Mt. Zion film soundtrack; it was packaged with Walker's first three studio albums in a box set titled The Complete Collection. His fourth studio album, Inventing Myself, includes the singles "Take It Easy", "Bulletproof", "Inventing Myself" and "Like It's Over". As of October 2013, Walker has sold over 200,000 singles and nearly 100,000 albums.

Studio albums

Live albums

Compilation albums

Extended plays

Singles

As lead artist

As featured artist

Promotional singles

Other charted songs

Guest appearances

Music videos

Notes

References

External links 
 
 [ Stan Walker at Allmusic.com]

Discographies of Australian artists
Discographies of New Zealand artists
Pop music discographies
Rhythm and blues discographies
Discography